Janvier Sédonoudé Abouta (born 1 January 1981) is a Malian former professional footballer who played as a forward.

He was part of the Malian 2004 Olympic football team, who exited in the quarter finals, finishing top of group A, but losing to Italy in the next round.

Career statistics

International goals
Scores and results list Mali's goal tally first.

External links

1981 births
Living people
Association football forwards
Malian footballers
Mali international footballers
Malian expatriate footballers
Malian expatriate sportspeople in Algeria
Footballers at the 2004 Summer Olympics
Olympic footballers of Mali
Expatriate footballers in Algeria
Djoliba AC players
2004 African Cup of Nations players
Expatriate footballers in Saudi Arabia
Al-Raed FC players
Saudi Professional League players
21st-century Malian people